Keith Moore (born 12 October 1960) is the author and co-author of several IETF RFCs related to the MIME and SMTP protocols for electronic mail, among others:
, defining a mechanism to allow SMTP clients and servers to avoid transferring messages so large that they will be rejected;
, defining a (rarely implemented) means to allow MIME messages to contain attachments whose actual contents are referenced by a URL;
 obsoleting ,
 obsoleting ,
 obsoleting , which together define a standard mechanism for reporting of delivery failures or successes in Internet email,
, standards for processes that automatically respond to electronic mail; and
, recommending the use of TLS for email submission and access, and the deprecation of cleartext versions of the protocols used for those purposes.

He has also written or co-written RFCs on other topics, including
, Use of HTTP State Management (recommending constraints on the use of "cookies" to address privacy concerns);
, On the use of HTTP as a Substrate (discussing the use of HTTP as a layer underneath other protocols); and
, describing the 6to4 mechanism for tunneling IPv6 packets over an IPv4 network.

He was born in Nashville, Tennessee, United States of America.  He earned a Bachelor of Science degree in Electrical Engineering from Tennessee Technological University in 1985, and a Master of Science degree in Computer Science from the University of Tennessee in 1996.

From 1996 to 1999 he served as a member of the Internet Engineering Steering Group as one of two co-directors for the Applications Area.

References

External links
Network Heresies

Living people
1960 births
American computer specialists
People from Nashville, Tennessee